The Iowa, Sac, and Fox Presbyterian Mission, also known as the Highland Presbyterian Mission, is a historic Presbyterian mission building near Highland, Kansas.

The building was constructed in 1846 to replace an earlier building. The mission was used as a church and school by the Native Americans in the area. The building added to the National Register of Historic Places in 1970.

See also
Iowa and Sac & Fox Mission State Historic Site

References

External links
Historical information

Presbyterian churches in Kansas
Churches on the National Register of Historic Places in Kansas
Buildings and structures in Doniphan County, Kansas
National Register of Historic Places in Doniphan County, Kansas